Canción de amor (English: Love Song) is a Mexican telenovela directed by Alfredo Gurrola and produced by Luis de Llano Macedo for Televisa in 1996. It premiered on Canal de las Estrellas on Monday, May 13, 1996, and ended on Friday, September 13, 1996.

Eduardo Capetillo and Lorena Rojas starred as protagonists.

Plot 
Ana is the cute star of Love Song, who falls in love with Renzo, a rock singer when she faces a wonderful future. From the moment they meet, Ana's life changes radically as she struggles to Renzo and leukemia, which has recently been diagnosed.

Ana decides to live his life intensely Renzo marrying and giving a daughter, to preserve the great love they have. Renzo is the antidote to the disease of Ana and Ana is the strength of Renzo. She supports what to fight for success.

Unfortunately, this young couple can not cope with their responsibilities and begin to have a painful separation. Ana knows that only time and maturity of the can save, but also knows she does not have much time.

Ana desperately struggling with his illness and his fate with the only weapons she has: its vitality, beauty and intelligence. The characters of Love Song face great passions and great disappointments.

Cast 
 
Eduardo Capetillo as Lorenzo "Renzo"
Lorena Rojas† as Ana
Joaquín Cordero† as Norberto
Nuria Bages as Nora
Alonso Echánove† as Ernesto #1
Jaime Garza† as Ernesto #2
Raul Julia-Levy as Marcos Fuentes
Pedro Weber "Chatanuga"† as Elías
Hugo Acosta as Dr. Ariel
Leticia Sabater as Valeria
Zoila Quiñones as Ofelia
Laureano Brizuela as Álvarez
Jorge Salinas as Damián
Mauricio Islas as Edgar
Aylín Mújica as Estrella
Abraham Ramos as Adrián
Mariana Seoane as Roxana
Marcela Páez as Sylvia
Javier Herranz as Antonio
Marcela Pezet as Suzy
Roberto Blandón as Javier
Rosa María Bianchi as Alina
Ana Bertha Espín as Juana
Mónika Sánchez as Genoveva
Guillermo García Cantú as Lic. Arizmendi
Javier Gómez as Rodrigo Pinel
Sergio Klainer as Diego
Eduardo Liñán as Marco
Gerardo Gallardo as Teodoro
Alejandro Rábago as Genaro
Óscar Traven as Arturo
José María Yazpik as Swami
Arlette Pacheco as Juliana
David Ramos as Ramiro Flores
Julio Monterde† as José Antonio
Paola Flores as Pánfila
Raúl Meraz† as Guillermo
Juan Ignacio Aranda
Marta Aura
Amparo Garrido
Lorenza Hegewish
Luisa Fernanda
Renato Bartilotti
Fernando Sarfatti
Dulce María
Yadhira Carrillo
Claudia Estrada
Carlos Calderón
Janina Hidalgo
Giorgio Palacios
Osc5ar Bonfiglio
Claudia Troyo
Verónica Jaspeado
Laura Morelos
Lourdes Aguilar
Yuvia Cárdenas
Jesús Lara
Vicente Herrera
Jaime Puga
Raúl Vega
Arturo Paulet
Antonio Muñiz
Aracely Arámbula

References

External links

1996 telenovelas
Mexican telenovelas
1996 Mexican television series debuts
1996 Mexican television series endings
Television shows set in Mexico
Televisa telenovelas
Mexican television series based on Argentine television series
Spanish-language telenovelas